Kosmos 32 ( meaning Cosmos 32) or Zenit-2 No.18 was a Soviet, first generation, low resolution, optical film-return reconnaissance satellite which was launched in 1964.

The launch of Kosmos 32 took place at 10:48 GMT on 10 June 1964. A Vostok-2 rocket, serial number R15001-02, was used to place the satellite into orbit, with Site 31/6 at the Baikonur Cosmodrome being used for the launch. Following its successful insertion into orbit the satellite received its Kosmos designation, along with the International Designator 1964-029A and the Satellite Catalog Number 00807.

Kosmos 32 was operated in a low Earth orbit. After eight days in orbit, Kosmos 32 was deorbited on 18 June 1964 with its return capsule descending by parachute for recovery by Soviet forces.

References

Spacecraft launched in 1964
Kosmos satellites
Spacecraft which reentered in 1964
Zenit-2 satellites